Favonius saphirinus is a butterfly in the family Lycaenidae. It is found in the Russian Far East, north-eastern China, Korea and Japan.

Subspecies
Favonius saphirinus saphirinus (Amur, Ussuri)
Favonius saphirinus graeseri Dantchenko, 2000 (southern Ussuri)
Favonius saphirinus jezonicus Murayama, 1953 (Japan: Hokkaido)
Favonius saphirinus nipponicus Murayama, 1953 (Japan: Honshu)
Favonius saphirinus okadai Koiwaya, 1996 (Sichuan)
Favonius saphirinus oseanus Murayama, 1953 (Japan: Honshu)
Favonius saphirinus pedius (Leech, 1894) (Sichuan)

References

Butterflies described in 1887
Theclini
Butterflies of Asia
Taxa named by Otto Staudinger